"One Thing Remains" is a worship song written by Brian Johnson, Jeremy Riddle and Christa Black Gifford. Initially released by Bethel Music on their second album Be Lifted High (2011), the song rose to prominence when it was performed by Christian organization Passion. It was released as Passion's second single from their 2012 album, Passion: White Flag, on September 14, 2012. It features guest vocals from American contemporary Christian music singer Kristian Stanfill. The song became both Passion and Stanfill's first Hot Christian Songs No. 1. The track held the No. 1 position for four weeks. Even with Brian Johnson singing it on Be Lifted High, the song was first released on Bethel's Youth (at the time) led group Jesus Culture on their album Come Away with Chris Quilala leading the song.

Track listing
Digital download
"One Thing Remains" – 5:48
Digital download (radio version)
"One Thing Remains" – 3:59

Charts

Weekly charts

Year-end charts

Decade-end charts

Certifications

References 

2012 singles
2012 songs
Passion Conferences songs